Kerekesné Sólyom Ilona (born 25 October 1926) is a Hungarian former international table tennis player.

Table tennis career
Kerekes won two medals in the World Table Tennis Championships and three medals in the Table Tennis European Championships.

Kerekes won two silver medals in 1950 and 1954 in the Corbillon Cup (women's team event).

Kerekes was also the runner-up in the European Championship final losing to Éva Kóczián in the final.

See also
 List of table tennis players
 List of World Table Tennis Championships medalists

References

1926 births
Possibly living people
Hungarian female table tennis players
Table tennis players from Budapest
World Table Tennis Championships medalists